Radio Lekhnath is a radio station in Lekhnath, Nepal. It transmits on 106.6 MHz. Radio Lekhnath produces various programmes related to current affairs, news, education, social, cultural and environmental awareness.

External link 
 Radio Lekhnath Online

References
Radio Lekhnath website
Radio Lekhnath Online

Radio stations in Nepal